Ratnapala may refer to:

 Ratna Pala, 10th century Indian king
 Ratnapala (Chahamana dynasty), 12th century Indian king
 Suri Ratnapala, Australian academic